Mercilessly Betrayed is a 2006 pornographic horror film written and directed by A. Simona, and co-written by Jimmy Tourette and Mike.

Plot 

When a bar owner named Schiller tells loan sharks Holt and Rocco he cannot pay back the money he owes them, the two thugs beat and torture him. As he is being assaulted, Schiller offers Holt and Rocco his wife, Anna, in place of money. Taking Schiller up on his offer, Holt and Rocco rape, torture and humiliate Anna in front of Schiller, and leave with her. Despite her injuries, Anna escapes Holt and Rocco's clutches, and swears bloody and brutal revenge on them and Schiller, who has moved on with a new girlfriend.

Cast 

 Nina Cheyenne
 Angela Brazil
 Sean Scott
 Andreas
 Jean Pallett
 Mister X

Release 

Mercilessly Betrayed had a limited release of 1500 copies in Germany.

Reception 

Film Bizarro wrote that Mercilessly Betrayed was lackluster, while Independent Flicks stated that everything about the film was bad, though the website gave it a half star out of ten "for at least trying".

External links

References 

2006 films
2006 horror films
German horror films
Films set in Germany
Films shot in Germany
2000s German-language films
Rape and revenge films
2000s pornographic films
German pornographic films
Pornographic horror films
2006 direct-to-video films
Direct-to-video horror films
German films about revenge
2000s German films